In Greek mythology, Leucosia (from λευκή , "white") was one of the Sirens. She was the daughter of the river-god Achelous and the Muse Melpomene or her sister Terpsichore. Leucosia's sisters were Parthenope and Ligeia. Leucosia's name was given to the island opposite to the Sirens' cape. Her body was found on the shore of Poseidonia.

Notes

References 

 John Tzetzes, Book of Histories, Book I translated by Ana Untila from the original Greek of T. Kiessling's edition of 1826.  Online version at theio.com
 Lycophron, The Alexandra  translated by Alexander William Mair. Loeb Classical Library Volume 129. London: William Heinemann, 1921. Online version at the Topos Text Project.
 Lycophron, Alexandra translated by A.W. Mair. London: William Heinemann; New York: G.P. Putnam's Sons. 1921. Greek text available at the Perseus Digital Library.
 Strabo, The Geography of Strabo. Edition by H.L. Jones. Cambridge, Mass.: Harvard University Press; London: William Heinemann, Ltd. 1924. Online version at the Perseus Digital Library.
 Strabo, Geographica edited by A. Meineke. Leipzig: Teubner. 1877. Greek text available at the Perseus Digital Library.

Women in Greek mythology
Sirens (mythology)